Square One Bus Terminal is a GO Transit intercity bus terminal located in central Mississauga, Ontario, Canada. It is situated directly across Rathburn Road West from the Mississauga City Centre Transit Terminal (the main hub for local MiWay bus service and a stop on the Mississauga Transitway) and the Square One Shopping Centre.

Routes stopping at the terminal include: off-peak bus service along the Milton GO Train corridor from downtown Toronto; Mississauga to Finch Bus Terminal; Mississauga to Guelph; Hamilton to Richmond Hill; Highway 407 West routes; and routes connecting Waterloo Region to Greater Toronto.

Services will also connect to the planned Hurontario LRT on Hurontario Street.

Facilities
A permanent terminal building was opened in March 2016. The terminal includes public washrooms, an indoor waiting area, staffed ticket counters and 24-hour automated ticket vending machines.

The terminal includes 193 parking spaces along Centre View Drive.

GO Bus services
Westbound platform assignments:
Platform 1: 40/40A Trafalgar Road, Dundas Street & Hamilton GO Centre
Platform 2: 46/46A/47
Platform 3: 47B McMaster University
Platform 4: 21/21A/21P/45
Platform 5: 29 Guelph/Mississauga
Platform 6: 25/25C Waterloo/Mississauga
Eastbound platform assignments:
Platform 8: 45/45A/47A Highway 407 45B Unionville GO Station
Platform 9: 46/47 Ontario Highway 407
Platform 10: 19/19B/19C Mississauga/North York/Kipling GO Station
Platform 12: 21/21A/21H/21J/21K/21P Toronto Union Station
Platform 13: 40 Pearson Airport/Richmond Hill GO Station

References

External links

Transport in Mississauga
GO Transit bus terminals
Buildings and structures in Mississauga
Transport infrastructure completed in 2016